India has a rich biodiversity of butterflies, of which skippers are a well represented family. Of the seven subfamilies belonging to the family Hesperiidae, four are found in India, comprising a total of 223 species of 74 genera and these are listed below.

General characteristics

Hesperids are often difficult to identify to species level in the field and accurate identification may require dissection and examination of the genitalia. The larval food plants are mainly grasses, palms and bamboos. Some feed on dicotyledon species. Eggs are smooth, or sometimes ridged and white or red in color. Larvae are cylindrical with a large head. They are usually green or transparent green and sometimes conspicuously marked. The larvae feed within cells made out of rolled leaves and pupation occurs inside the cell. The pupa is generally covered with fine white powder.

Checklist

Subfamily Coeliadinae

See List of butterflies of India (Coeliadinae) (20 species, four genera).

Subfamily Hesperiinae

See List of butterflies of India (Hesperiinae) (133 species, 48 genera).

Subfamily Pyrginae

See List of butterflies of India (Pyrginae) (51 species, 21 genera).

Subfamily Heteropterinae

 Apostictopterus fuliginosus Leech, 1893

See also
 Hesperiidae
 List of butterflies of India
 Fauna of India

Cited references

References
Print

 

Online

Hesperiidae
India
B